The San Fernando de Dilao Parish, also known as Paco Church, is a parish church located in the district of Paco in the city of Manila, Philippines, honoring the Castillian king saint Fernando III de Castilla y León. From February 7, 2012 to April 9, 2014, the parish was used as the pro-cathedral of Manila, during the structural renovations of the Manila Cathedral. The church inside is notable for its Romanesque-Byzantine interior with recently Italian Baroque styled altar, most notably the Latin inscriptions similar in style to Saint Peter's Basilica in Rome.

The church is currently administered by its parish priest, the very Rev. Msgr. Rolando R. de la Cruz, . In addition, the church provides active medical, dental, and ENT charitable services for its poor parishioners within the community.

History
In 1580, the first church built was made of nipa and bamboo and was originally dedicated to Our Lady of Purification. Fray Juan de Garrovillas of the Franciscan order rebuilt the church using stone materials from 1599 to 1601. The neighbourhood's name Dilao refers to a local shrub once used to dye textiles yellow (current Filipino orthography: diláw, "yellow").

On October 3, 1603, the church was attacked and burned by Chinese persons during riots. It was repaired in 1606 and rebuilt with stone materials by Don Francisco Gómez de Arellano. Invading troops from the Kingdom of Great Britain burnt down the church in 1762 during their occupation of the city as part of the Seven Years' War. In 1791, a temporary church made of bamboo and nipa was erected.

Fray Joaquín Segui constructed the stone convento from 1793 to 1794, which was repaired in 1854. In 1880, this convent was ruined by an earthquake. Fr. Bernardo de la Concepción began the construction of a new church in 1809, which was completed in 1814. It was called Antigua Iglesia de Paco ("Old Paco Church"), while Fr. Miguel Richar built the belfry from 1839 to 1841. Earthquakes again destroyed the church in 1852 and 1880.

Fray Gilberto Martín began the reconstruction of the church in 1881. When this was about to be completed, a typhoon in 1892 partly destroyed the church. In 1896, Fray Gilberto completed the reconstruction work.

On February 5, 1899, the church was bombed and completely burned during the Philippine–American War. Belgian priests of the Congregatio Immaculati Cordis Mariae took possession of the burnt church in 1909, and in the following year, Fr. Raymundo Esquinet worked for the construction of a temporary concrete church at a site near the old church's ruins. In 1924, Fr. José Billie proposed a newer and much larger church, and the cornerstone of the present church was laid in August 1931.

On February 7, 2012, the church was designated as pro-cathedral of the Manila until structural renovations on the Manila Cathedral were completed on April 9, 2014.

A notable longstanding custom of the church today is the devotion to Nuestro Santo Padre Jesús del Sepulcro. Also known as Santo Entierro, the image is a statue of the dead Christ encased in a special wood and glass casket, and is a common icon in Filipino churches.

Architecture 
The church façade, flanked by tall, twin belfries, possess a neoclassical style of architecture. The terraced, arcaded portico provides a transitional entrance to the church. The Corinthian columns on the first and second levels of the church plus the triangular pediment give the façade the classic character.

Clergy

Diocesan parish priests

Priests

Gallery

See also
► National Consecration to the Immaculate Heart of Mary

References

External links

San Fernando de Dilao Parish Church
Templorum – San Fernando de Dilao Parish Church

Roman Catholic churches in Manila
Buildings and structures in Paco, Manila
Cultural Properties of the Philippines in Metro Manila
Churches in the Roman Catholic Archdiocese of Manila